Pumpelly Glacier is in Glacier National Park in the U.S. state of Montana. Pumpelly Glacier is just west of the Continental Divide and adjacent to Pumpkin Glacier, the two glaciers separated by crevasses. The glacier was named after Raphael Pumpelly who had first sighted the glacier in 1883. Pumpelly and Pumpkin Glaciers cover  as of 2005, a 15 percent reduction in area since 1966.

See also
 List of glaciers in the United States
 Glaciers in Glacier National Park (U.S.)

References

Glaciers of Flathead County, Montana
Glaciers of Glacier National Park (U.S.)
Glaciers of Montana